In chemistry, the law of multiple proportions states that if two elements form more than one compound, then the ratios of the masses of the second element which combine with a fixed mass of the first element will always be ratios of small whole numbers. This law is also known as: Dalton's Law, named after John Dalton, the chemist who first expressed it.

For example, Dalton knew that the element carbon forms two oxides by combining with oxygen in different proportions. A fixed mass of carbon, say 100 grams, may react with 133 grams of oxygen to produce one oxide, or with 266 grams of oxygen to produce the other. The ratio of the masses of oxygen that can react with 100 grams of carbon is 266:133 = 2:1, a ratio of small whole numbers. Dalton interpreted this result in his atomic theory by proposing (correctly in this case) that the two oxides have one and two oxygen atoms respectively for each carbon atom. In modern notation the first is CO (carbon monoxide) and the second is CO2 (carbon dioxide).

John Dalton first expressed this observation in 1804. A few years previously, the French chemist Joseph Proust had proposed the law of definite proportions, which expressed that the elements combined to form compounds in certain well-defined proportions, rather than mixing in just any proportion; and Antoine Lavoisier proved the law of conservation of mass, which also assisted Dalton. A careful study of the actual numerical values of these proportions led Dalton to propose his law of multiple proportions. This was an important step toward the atomic theory that he would propose later that year, and it laid the basis for chemical formulas for compounds.

Another example of the law can be seen by comparing ethane (C2H6) with propane (C3H8). The weight of hydrogen which combines with 1 g carbon is 0.252 g in ethane and 0.224 g in propane. The ratio of those weights is 1.125, which can be expressed as the ratio of two small numbers 9:8.

Limitations
The law of multiple proportions is best demonstrated using simple compounds.  For example, if one tried to demonstrate it using the hydrocarbons decane (chemical formula C10H22) and undecane (C11H24), one would find that 100 grams of carbon could react with 18.46 grams of hydrogen to produce decane or with 18.31 grams of hydrogen to produce undecane, for a ratio of hydrogen masses of 121:120, which is hardly a ratio of "small" whole numbers.

The law fails with non-stoichiometric compounds and also doesn't work well with polymers and oligomers.

History
The law of multiple proportions was a key proof of the atomic theory, but it is uncertain whether Dalton discovered the law of multiple proportions by accident and then used atomic theory to explain it, or whether his law was a hypothesis he proposed in order to investigate the validity of the atomic theory.

In 1792, Bertrand Pelletier discovered that a certain amount of tin will combine with a certain amount of oxygen to form one tin oxide, or twice the amount of oxygen to form a different oxide. Joseph Proust confirmed Pelletier's discovery and provided measurements of the composition: one tin oxide is 87 parts tin and 13 parts oxygen, and the other is 78.4 parts tin and 21.6 parts oxygen. These were likely tin(II) oxide (SnO) and tin dioxide (SnO2), and their actual compositions are 88.1% tin—11.9% oxygen, and 78.7% tin—21.3% oxygen.

Scholars who have reviewed the writings of Proust found that he had enough data to have discovered the law of multiple proportions himself, but somehow he did not. With regards to the aforementioned tin oxides, had Proust adjusted his figures for a tin content of 100 parts for both oxides, he would have noticed that 100 parts of tin will combine with either 14.9 or 27.6 parts of oxygen. 14.9 and 27.6 form a ratio of 1:1.85, which is 1:2 if one forgives experimental error. It seems this did not occur to Proust, but it occurred to Dalton.

Footnotes

Bibliography

Physical chemistry
Stoichiometry